Redl may refer to:

 Redl (surname)
 Colonel Redl, 1985 drama film
 Redl-Zipf, V-2 rocket facility
 Redl-Zipf railway station, railway station in Upper Austria